Run to You may refer to any of these songs:
"Run to You" (Bryan Adams song)
"Run to You" (Roxette song)
"Run to You" (Whitney Houston song)
"Run to You", a song by Flo Rida featuring T-Pain or Redfoo
"Run to You", a song by Dina Carroll
"Run to You", a song by Plus One
"Run to You", a song by Anne Haigis
"Run to You", a song by Quiet Riot from their second self-titled album
"Run to You", a song by new age composer Ryan Farish 
"Run to You", a song by Twila Paris
"Run to You", a song by LEDApple
"Run to You", a song by Pentatonix from their album PTX, Vol. II
"Run 2 U", a song by Jewel from her album 0304
"Run2U", a song by STAYC
"Run to You", a song by Lea Michele from her album Places
"Run to You" (Planetboom song)

See also
"I Run to You", a song by Lady Antebellum